Mil e Uma Noites is the fourth (and originally final, until their reunion in 2017) studio album of Brazilian pop girl group Rouge, released on May 30, 2005, by Sony BMG. The work is a mix of new tracks and a greatest hits compilation, including "Ragatanga", "Brilha La Luna" and "Blá Blá Blá". Previously unreleased songs were "Me Leva Contigo", "Mais Uma Da Lista", "Cidade Triste", "Onde Está O Amor?", "O Amor é Ilusão" and the lead single "Vem Habib (Wala Wala)", and a bonus acoustic version of the hit "Um Anjo Veio Me Falar". The album sold more than 50,000 copies in Brazil.

Background

After releasing three albums, the girls wanted their new album to have only new songs, but the record company wanted a compilation album. For Rouge, to have new songs at that moment (2005) was a way to prove to the public and the press that the group did not end, as was speculated. The rumors, according to Patrícia Lissa, started because the quartet was living a transition period since 2004, when it left the producer RGB and were signed to Arsenal (Rick Bonadio) after Luciana Andrade's departure. Also, their last album was not as successful as their first two albums. In addition, their label, Sony Music, merged with BMG.

"Today many people respect us and do not see us as a laboratory band, a disposable product, made to sell millions of a single disc, give money to many people and then disappear," she says. After the discussion about the fate of the album, Mil e Uma Noites became a compilation and an album of new songs in a single album. The format of the album was the form found by the girls to reconcile their interests with those of the record company.

Songs

Of the 14 tracks on the CD, the fourth and last in the career of Patricia, Aline, Karin and Fantine, six are new. The remaining eight songs are hits taken from previous albums, including an acoustic version unheard of for the hit "Um Anjo Veio Me Falar."

The first working track of Mil e Uma Noites is "Vem Habib (Wala Wala)", one of six unpublished songs from the album. Maintaining the group's proposal - dance melody, relaxed lyrics and children's appeal - the song was compared to "Ralando o Tchan (Dança do Ventre)", by the group É o Tchan, for the Arab theme. But according to Patrícia, references to the song were Rich Girl, released by No Doubt vocalist Gwen Stefani on her solo album Love. Angel. Music. Baby. (2004) And "Whenever, Wherever," Shakira's hit. Another highlight is the version for the song "Torn", of Natalie Imbruglia, that became "O Amor é Ilusão", written by songwriter Milton Guedes.

Critical reception 

The reviewer Bruno Nogueira from Folhapé praised the album, arguing, "They continue to show what they have tasted in the Popstars program marathon: they are voices capable of delivering hits when they are well disciplined." Mil e Uma Noites variation is fine enjoyable, except probably for the very working music that invests too much in the sounds of the Middle East appropriated by Rede Globo in the novel O Clone. guitar and melodies that oscillate between the melancholic and the agitated, depending on the point of view that one wants to give the central theme, love. Without detracting from the original part of Bonadio's work, the high point is really the versions. is an "O Amor é Ilusão", the interesting "Não Dá pra Resistir" appear, and "Um Anjo Veio Me Falar", in an acoustic version.

In addition to the release on television, the girls also performed all over Brazil, in what became the band's last tour, The Mil e Uma Noite Tour, in 2005. The group also made a special appearance in Band's Floribella, singing the single "Vem Habib (Wala Wala)" and the success "Um Anjo Veio Me Falar".

Singles
The first single from the album, "Vem Habib (Wala Wala)" was released on May 23, 2005 on Brazilian radio stations. His music video was recorded in the desert on June 3 and premiered on June 16 on MTV. The second and last single of the album, "O Amor é Ilusão", was released at the end of September 2005.

Track listing

Notes

Rouge (group) albums
2005 albums
2005 compilation albums
Albums produced by Rick Bonadio